The Musée de la Franc-Maçonnerie (French Museum of Freemasonry) is a museum of Freemasonry located in the 9th arrondissement at 16, rue Cadet, Paris, France. It is open daily except Sundays and Mondays; an admission fee is charged. The closest métro station is Cadet.
The museum was established in 1889 by the Grand Orient de France as a cabinet of curiosities in the Hotel Cadet. It was despoiled in the German occupation of France during World War II but reopened in 1973, and in 2000 became an official museum of France. In that same year, many of its historical documents were returned from Moscow, where they had been held by the KGB after Germany's defeat in World War II.

Today, the museum presents the history of French Freemasonry through its symbols, grades, documents, and objects. It contains approximately 10,000 items displayed in permanent exhibit space (800 m²), about 23,000 volumes in its archives (400 m²), and a further 400 m² dedicated to temporary exhibits. Among the historically important items in its collection are Voltaire's masonic apron (1778), Lafayette's masonic sword, a first edition of James Anderson's Constitutions of the Free Masons (1723), satirical prints by William Hogarth (1697-1764), Meissen porcelain figurine (1740), etc.

See also 
 List of museums in Paris

References 

 Musée de la Franc-Maçonnerie
 Paris.org entry
 Paris.fr entry
 Musée du Grand Orient de France et de la Franc-Maçonnerie européenne, Musée du Grand Orient de France, 95 pages, ca. 1985.

Museums in Paris
Buildings and structures in the 9th arrondissement of Paris
Masonic museums
Freemasonry in France
Museums established in 1889